Solitaire's Journey is a 1992 video game by Quantum Quality Productions for Amiga and DOS.

Gameplay
Solitaire's Journey includes a variety of solitaire games, which can be played in the campaign style of either transcontinental trip or haunted house.

Development
Solitaire's Journey was designed by Andrew Visscher, who pitched it as an "unsolicited submission" to Quantum Quality Productions.

Reception
Allen L. Greenberg reviewed the game for Computer Gaming World, and stated that "Journey will prove an effective way of satisfying that primal appetite for entertainment."

According to Computer Gaming World, Solitaire's Journey was a commercial success. Jeff Koke reviewed Solitaire's Journey in Pyramid #1 (May/June, 1993), and stated that "This is not the type of game that eats your brain for 10 hours a day, but it's not meant to be. Instead it's a game that provides a new twist on a very old pastime, and does it admirably."

In 1996, Computer Gaming World declared Solitaire's Journey the 72nd-best computer game ever released.

References

External links
Review in Compute!

1992 video games
Amiga games
DOS games
Patience video games
Quantum Quality Productions games
Video games developed in the United States